23S rRNA (adenine2503-C2)-methyltransferase (RlmN, YfgB, Cfr) is an enzyme with systematic name S-adenosyl-L-methionine:23S rRNA (adenine2503-C2)-methyltransferase. This enzyme catalyses the following chemical reaction

 2 S-adenosyl-L-methionine + adenine2503 in 23S rRNA  S-adenosyl-L-homocysteine + L-methionine + 5'-deoxyadenosine + 2-methyladenine2503 in 23S rRNA

23S rRNA (adenine2503-C2)-methyltransferase contains an [4Fe-4S] cluster.

References

External links 

EC 2.1.1